The Battle of Caesarea occurred in 1067 when the Seljuk Turks under Alp Arslan attacked Caesarea. Caesarea was sacked and its Cathedral of St. Basil desecrated. Following Caesarea, the Seljuk Turks made another attempt invading Anatolia, with an assault on Iconium in 1069. This provoked Romanos IV Diogenes' second campaign.

References

Sources
 
 
 
 

Battles of the Byzantine–Seljuk wars
Battles in medieval Anatolia
History of Kayseri Province
1060s in the Byzantine Empire
Conflicts in 1067
1067 in Asia
11th century in the Seljuk Empire